Leandro Souza may refer to:

 Leandro Souza (footballer, born 1986), Brazilian football centre-back
 Leandro Souza (footballer, born 1987), Brazilian football forward